Ivar is a 1980 Indian Malayalam film,  directed by I. V. Sasi and produced by M. O. Joseph. The film stars Sharada, Seema, Sukumaran and Jose in the lead roles. The film has musical score by G. Devarajan.

Cast

Sharada as Savithri/Margaret
Seema as Lisa
Sukumari as Mary
Jose as Stanley
Sankaradi as Varkey
Raghavan as Damu
Sathaar
Sukumaran as Raghavan Nair
Bahadoor as Koyaakka
Balan K. Nair as Avaran Muthalali
Kunchan as Porinchu
M. G. Soman as Leslie
Meena as Savithri's Mother
Paravoor Bharathan as Savithri's Father
Ravikumar as Babu
Silk Smitha as Susamma
 Kollam G. K. Pillai

Soundtrack
The music was composed by G. Devarajan and the lyrics were written by P. Bhaskaran.

References

External links
 

1980 films
1980s Malayalam-language films
Films directed by I. V. Sasi